Lawyers ( is a 2005 South Korean television series starring Jung Hye-young, Kim Sang-kyung, Kim Sung-soo and Han Go-eun. It aired on MBC from July 4 to August 23, 2005 on Monday and Tuesday at 21:55 for 16 episodes.

Plot
After the accident of Ju-hee's parents, her relationship with her boyfriend Yoon Seok-ki has to be ended suddenly. Ju-hee works as Seo Jeong-ho's secretary, and Seok-ki continues his study to US. After five years separated, they meet each other again in the lawfirm. Seok-ki begins working there, with Yang Ha-young as his secretary. Since then, the conflict between all of them begins.

Cast

Main cast
 Jung Hye-young as Kim Ju-hee (law firm secretary)
 Kim Sang-kyung as Seo Jeong-ho (attorney)
 Kim Sung-soo as Alex Yoon / Yoon Seok-ki (attorney)
 Han Go-eun as Yang Ha-young (secretary)

Extended cast
Chu Sang-mi as Song Yi Ryong (attorney)
Lee Hwi-jae as Lee Jae Suh (attorney)
Lee Dong-hoon as Jang Ki Soon (attorney)
Kim Byung-ki as Koh Young Joon (law firm president)
Im Jung-eun as Kim Se Hee
Jerome To as Tommy
Choi Yeo-jin as Deborah Hong

References

External links
Lawyers official website 
The Lawyers at MBC Global Media

MBC TV television dramas
2005 South Korean television series debuts
2005 South Korean television series endings
Korean-language television shows
South Korean legal television series